The Ovelgönne bread roll is the remaining part of a bread roll originating from the Pre-Roman Iron Age of Northern Europe, which was found in 1952 during archaeological excavations in a loam mine in the Buxtehude district Ovelgönne in Lower Saxony, Germany. The piece of bread is the oldest surviving formed bakery product from Europe. The find, along with a reconstruction, are in the permanent exhibition of the Archaeological Museum Hamburg in Harburg, Hamburg.

Location of find 

The backfilling of the pit was irregularly mixed up with shards of pottery, pieces of charcoal, lumps of clay, and stones, suggesting an Iron Age rubbish pit. Half down the pit, the remains of the charred bread was found.

Findings 

The Ovelgönne bread roll originally had two tip-shaped ends. Due to its regular shape, it is categorized among the formed bakery products having a predefined shape. The strongly charred loaf of bread was aborted at about the half its length. The point of the remaining end is missing. The colour of the surface is pearl grey to slate grey, the underside is grey to black. The top of the roll has a fine and slightly curved incision, which is designed to prevent tearing during the baking process. A second hole was most likely also on the missing half of the loaf. The bread had no pronounced crust and it was baked from a very finely ground and sifted wheat flour. A microscopic examination of the surface showed that the dough contained only remarkable small traces of wear fine millstones. The dough itself was kneaded thoroughly and showed only very small porosity, suggesting that neither a wild yeast fermentation nor a sourdough were used to leaven the bread loaf. Possibly for lightening of the dough, protein or fat was added. The baking process must have taken place in an oven on a stone surface which was good, but not completely cleaned of coal, as small charcoal remains have been reflected in the pores of the base. The bread was baked at an excessive top heat, compared to today's baking practice. Sandy deposits in the inner parts of the fracture surface indicates that the bread was broken apart before its discovery. A radiological examination performed in Bern (Switzerland) showed that the superficial incision widened inwards slightly. The radiological images also showed  two, mysterious metal particles of  ×  and  × , embedded in the dough.

From his investigation of numerous archaeological bread finds, Max Währen reconstructed the original size of the complete bread roll, considering a 15% shrinkage by the charring to estimated  ×  × .

Due to typological determination of the ceramic vessel shards found in the pit, the Ovelgönne bread roll was dated to the early Iron Age, around 800-500 B.C.

Interpretation 

The circumstances and the location of the Ovelgönne bread roll in the pit is the subject of debate. Some authors suggest a cultic context. This is attributed to the halving of the bread roll before its deposition and the baked in metal pieces. Whether the metal pieces were deliberately baked in or accidentally fell into the dough is unclear. Währen questions whether "the Ovelgönne bread roll was a technical creation or a replica of a profane or ritual object." He sums up the importance of the object up as follows:

His opinion is based on the remarkable subtlety of the used wheat flour, which is close to grain sizes of modern flours, as well as the incision and the dipped in holes. Such dipped in holes are also known from an ancient Egyptian find dating around 2000-1778 BCE as well as from mosaics at the Basilica of Sant'Apollinare Nuovo in Ravenna dating to the 6th Century. However, the dipped in hole on the Ovelgönne bread roll is the earliest prehistoric evidence for this technique in Europe.

See also

 Food history
 List of bread rolls
 List of breads

References

Literature 
 
 

Archaeology of Lower Saxony
Archaeological artifacts
Iron Age Germany
Archaeological discoveries in Germany
Germanic archaeological artifacts
Pre-Roman Iron Age
Archäologisches Museum Hamburg
1st-millennium BC works
Breads
1952 archaeological discoveries